Belén de Escobar (or Escobar) is a city in the urban conurbation of Greater Buenos Aires in Buenos Aires Province, Argentina. It is the administrative seat for Escobar Partido. The city has an important Japanese Argentine population.

External links

 Official website
 Ciudad Floral website

Populated places in Buenos Aires Province
Populated places established in 1877
Escobar Partido
Cities in Argentina
1877 establishments in Argentina